Silvio Delgado (born 13 December 1940) is a Cuban former sports shooter. He competed in the 50 metre rifle, prone event at the 1968 Summer Olympics.

References

1940 births
Living people
Cuban male sport shooters
Olympic shooters of Cuba
Shooters at the 1968 Summer Olympics
Sportspeople from Matanzas
Pan American Games medalists in shooting
Pan American Games silver medalists for Cuba
Shooters at the 1971 Pan American Games
20th-century Cuban people